Sum: Forty Tales from the Afterlives, also simply called Sum, is a work of speculative fiction by American neuroscientist David Eagleman. It is in press in 28 languages . The Los Angeles Times described it as "teeming, writhing with imagination."<ref name= "LATimes">[http://www.latimes.com/features/books/la-ca-discoveries1-2009feb01,0,6815929.story David Eaglemans Sum] (book review), Los Angeles Times, February 1, 2009. Retrieved on 2009-02-08.</ref>  Barnes and Noble named it one of the Best Books of 2009.

Overview
As a short story cycle, the book presents forty mutually exclusive stories staged in a wide variety of possible afterlives. The author has stated that none of the stories is meant to be taken as serious theological proposals but, instead, that the message of the book is the importance of exploring new ideas beyond the ones that have been traditionally passed down.

The title word "Sum" refers to the Latin for "I am", as in Cogito ergo sum.

Like Italo Calvino's Invisible Cities, Sum does not fit entirely into the traditional category of a novel. Sum has been called "philosofiction", an "experimental novel", and "a collection of thought experiments".  Most of the stories are understood to "posit the afterlife as mirroring life on Earth"Stark, A. In Our End Is Our Beginning, Wall Street Journal, February 13, 2009.

The New York Times Book Review called Sum a "delightful, thought-provoking little collection [which] belongs to that category of strange, unclassifiable books that will haunt the reader long after the last page has been turned". Sum was chosen by Time magazine for their 2009 Summer Reading list, with the acclaim "Eagleman is a true original. Read Sum and be amazed. Reread Sum and be reamazed.". Sum was selected as Book of the Week by both The Guardian and The Week and was the featured subject on the cover of two magazines in 2009, The Big Issue and Humanitie. On September 10, 2009, Sum was ranked by Amazon as the #2 best-selling book in the United Kingdom.

The book received accolades from non-religious reviewers as well as from the religious community. The recommendations of Stephen Fry, Philip Pullman, Brian Greene, Brian Eno, and others appear on the cover. In 2018, Tim Ferriss wrote in his newsletter, "Don't let the title of this book fool you; it isn’t making a case for the afterlife. Instead, this short read... is a collection of 40 thought exercises on the nature of existence, reality, perception, death, pain, boredom, and more. It's remarkably elegant and fun. At the very least, it should make you appreciate your own life — warts and all — much more."

Philosophy
Eagleman refers to himself as a possibilian and to Sum as a reflection of that position.Choose your afterlife,  MSNBC.com, Sept 10, 2009.  According to his definition, possibilianism rejects both the idiosyncratic claims of traditional theism and the certainty of atheism in favor of a middle, exploratory ground.  The possibilian perspective is distinguished from agnosticism in that it consists of an active exploration of novel possibilities and an emphasis on holding multiple hypotheses at once when no data is available to privilege one position over the others.  Possibilianism is understood to be consonant with the "scientific temperament" of creativity and tolerance for multiple ideas when there is a lack of data.  Speaking with The New York Times, Eagleman stated that he was working on a book entitled Why I Am a Possibilian.

Related publications and performances

In June 2009, Eagleman and musician Brian Eno performed a musical reading of Sum at the Sydney Opera House in Australia.

In May 2010, Sum debuted as an opera at the Royal Opera House in London. The music was composed by Max Richter, with choreography by Wayne McGregor.

A September 2009 episode of Radiolab featured a discussion with Eagleman and readings of two of the stories by actor Jeffrey Tambor.

The scientific journal Nature originally published one of the stories in Sum, "A Brief History of Death Switches". This story was subsequently anthologized in Futures from Nature.

The audiobook of Sum was narrated by Eagleman as well as by Gillian Anderson, Emily Blunt, Nick Cave, Jarvis Cocker, Jack Davenport, Lisa Dwan, Noel Fielding, Kerry Fox, Stephen Fry, Clarke Peters, Lemn Sissay, and Harriet Walter. In 2010, Canongate Books released an iOS enhanced eBook version of Sum, integrating the audiobook with the text.

Readings from the book are featured in a number of episodes of the Canadian Broadcasting Corporation's radio programme WireTap:

References

External links
 Author's official website
 Starred review from  Publishers Weekly''
 Sum in Random House catalog
 Possibilian.com

Philosophy of religion
2009 speculative fiction novels
American short story collections
2009 short story collections
Pantheon Books books
Speculative fiction short story collections